Ministry of Public Health of Afghanistan is the ministry of the government of Afghanistan which deals with matters concerning the health of Afghanistan's population.  the acting minister of Health was Dr. Wahid Majrooh until Taliban Takeover of Kabul. The Ministry of Public Health provides an annual report to inform the public of advancements in Afghanistan's health sector.

The ministry
Following the U.S. invasion of Afghanistan the Ministry of Health, along with the World Health Organization and other technical partners and donors reconstructed the health sector. At the time, at least 70% of the Afghan population was dependent on health services provided by the international community. Almost six million Afghans had no or very little access to medical care. In addition, 50 of the country's 330 districts had no health facilities whatsoever.

The goal of the ministry is to develop the health sector to improve the health of the people of Afghanistan, especially women and children, through implementing the basic package of health services (BPHS) and the essential package of hospital services (EPHS) as the standard, agreed-upon minimum of health care to be provided at each level of the health system. It wants to reduce the high levels of mortality and morbidity by:
 1) Improving access to quality emergency and routine reproductive and child health services,
 2) Increasing the coverage and quality of services to prevent and treat communicable diseases and malnutrition among children and adults
 3) Strengthening institutional development and management at central and provincial levels to ensure the effective and cost-efficient delivery of quality health services and
4) Further developing the capacity of health personnel to manage and better deliver quality health services.

Ministers

References

External links
Ministry of Public Health Afghanistan (MoPH)
Afghanistan Online's Health Section
 

Public Health
Medical and health organisations based in Afghanistan
Afghanistan